The fourth season of the Indonesian reality talent show The Voice Kids Indonesia premiered on February 4, on GTV with Marcell Siahaan returning for his second time as coach, while Yura Yunita & Rizky Febian and Isyana Sarasvati replacing Agnez Mo and Kaka Satriaji. This season initially will be aired at 2020, but delayed in 2021 because of COVID-19 pandemic.

Audition

Coaches & Hosts

Coach 
 Marcell Siahaan
 Yura Yunita & Rizky Febian
 Isyana Sarasvati

Host 
 Ananda Omesh
 Ersa Mayori
 Okky Lukman (guest host)

Teams
Color key:

Blind Auditions 

A new feature within the Blind Auditions this season is the Block, which each coach can use twice to prevent one of the other coaches from getting a contestant.

Color key:

Episode 1 (February 4)

Episode 2 (February 5) 

 Yura & Rizky tried to block Isyana, but Isyana pressed her button first, so the block did not count.

Episode 3 (February 11) 

 Yura & Rizky blocked Isyana, but Isyana did not press her button, so the block did not count.

Episode 4 (February 12)

Episode 5 (February 18)

Episode 6 (February 19)

Episode 7 (February 25)

Episode 8 (February 26)

Episode 9 (March 4)

Battles 

The battles began on March 11. The advisors for this season were Wizzy for Team Marcell, Ardhito Pramono for Team Yura & Rizky, and Nino Kayam for Team Isyana.

The power to steal an artist from other teams is implemented during this season. Each coach can steal one losing artist from another team. Artists who won their battle or are stolen by another coach advance to the Live Shows.

Color key:

Live Shows 

The live shows consists of four weeks. Starting with the Top 24 and ending with the Finale. This season, the voting system has changed. Unlike the previous three seasons, People can vote their favorite artists via RCTI+ app, instead of SMS.

During first Live Shows until Finale, Ananda Omesh was replaced by Okky Lukman because Omesh has tested positive to COVID-19 based of his Instagram story and an episode of Podkesmas podcast on Spotify which consist of himself.

Color key:

Week 1: Top 24, Group 1 (March 18) 
The 12 artists performed for the votes of the public. The artist with the highest number of votes on each team directly advanced to the Semifinals. Then, each coach completing their respective teams with their own choice.

Week 2: Top 24, Group 2 (March 25) 
The 12 artists performed for the votes of the public. The artist with the highest number of votes on each team directly advanced to the Semifinals. Then, each coach completing their respective teams with their own choice.

Week 3: Semifinals, Top 12 (April 1) 

The Semifinals opened by The Sacred Riana.

The 12 artists performed for the votes of the public. The artist with the highest number of votes on each team directly advanced to the Finale. Then, each coach completing their respective teams with their own choice.

Week 4: Finale (April 8) 

The Finale consists of two rounds, Top 6 and Top 3.

Top 6 

The 6 artists performed for the votes of the public. In the finale, all artists competed each other, not based on their team. The three artist with the highest number of votes directly advanced to the Top 3.

Top 3 

The Top 3 competed for the title as the Season's Winner.

Elimination Charts

Overall 

Color key
Artist's info

Result details

Teams 

Color key
Artist's info

Results details

Artists who appeared on previous shows or season
 Hadijah Shahab was a children actress that became famous after starring a soap opera entitled "Tangan-Tangan Mungil" as Lilu, a little robot. The soap opera aired in RCTI at 2013.
 Britney Kimberly appeared on the first, second and third season of Indonesian Idol Junior in 2014, 2016, and 2018 and was eliminated in second elimination round, Top 13 and showcase round respectively. She also appeared on the fifth season of Idola Cilik in 2015 and was eliminated in Menuju Pentas round.
 Cheryl Xaviera, Larissa Biel, Nakisha Thalita, Nikita Mawarni and Vasilysa Stefanovna appeared on the third season of Indonesian Idol Junior in 2018 and were eliminated in first elimination round.
 Alisha Nadira appeared on the second season of Indonesian Idol Junior in 2016 and was eliminated in group round.
 Mirai Naziel and Badnur Razky appeared on the third season of Indonesian Idol Junior in 2018 and were eliminated in Top 8 and second elimination round respectively.
 Safeenah Vidri appeared on the second season in 2016, but failed to turn any chairs.
 Olivia Christie and Nataya Angeleius appeared on the first season of Pop Academy in 2020 and was eliminated in Top 40 and final audition round respectively.
 Chelsea Jove appeared on the third season in 2018, but failed to turn any chairs.

References 

The Voice Indonesia